Sassetot-le-Mauconduit is a commune in the Seine-Maritime department in the Normandy region in northern France.

Geography
The commune is sandwiched between two ‘’vallons’’, short valleys that create a gap in the huge cliffs, giving access to the sea via the pebble beach. The name comes from the Norman "Sax-Tot", meaning ‘’village of the Saxons". Mauconduit was the name of the 13th century seigneurs.

Heraldry

Population

Places of interest
 The church, dating from the nineteenth century.
 The eighteenth-century chateau and park of Sassetot
 The eighteenth-century chateau of Briquedalle
 The chateau of Criquemanville.
 Three chapels.
 The sixteenth-century stone cross in the cemetery.

See also
Communes of the Seine-Maritime department

References

External links

Website of the commune of Sassetot-le-Mauconduit 

Communes of Seine-Maritime